Frog Lake may refer to any of several places in the U.S. state of Oregon:

There are 8 bodies of water listed as of October 18, 2013.

See also
 List of lakes in Oregon

Lakes of Oregon